Poa rodwayi is a species of tussock grass that is native to south eastern Australia. Growing to 60 cm high, with greyish green leaves. Mostly found in grassland or grassy woodland plant communities. The type specimen was collected at Hobart, Tasmania.

References

rodwayi
Flora of Tasmania
Flora of Victoria (Australia)
Flora of South Australia
Poales of Australia
Plants described in 1970